The Argus is a regional newspaper serving Dundalk, Ireland. The paper is owned by Mediahuis, through its subsidiary Independent News & Media. The Argus is one of two non-free newspapers serving Dundalk, the other being the Dundalk Democrat.

The newspaper is named after Argus Panoptes, a hundred-eyed giant in Greek mythology. The newspaper’s staff work from home after the closure of their office in Park Street, Dundalk due to COVID-19 and cost cutting measures.

References

External links

1830 establishments in Ireland
Independent News & Media
Mass media in County Louth
Newspapers published in the Republic of Ireland
Publications established in 1830
Weekly newspapers published in Ireland